Lake Mungo is a 2008 Australian psychological horror film written and directed by Joel Anderson and starring Talia Zucker and Martin Sharpe. It employs mockumentary-style storytelling with found footage and docufiction elements, using actor "interviewees" to present the narrative of a family trying to come to terms with the drowning death of their daughter, and the potentially supernatural events they experience after it.

Lake Mungo premiered at the Sydney Film Festival on 18 June 2008 and screened at the South by Southwest film festival in Austin, Texas, US, in March 2009.

Plot
Sixteen-year-old Alice Palmer drowns while swimming with her family at a dam in Ararat, Australia. Her older brother Mathew sets up video cameras around the house to record what seem to be images of Alice's ghost. They consult psychic Ray Kemeney for insight on the apparent haunting, but he is unable to explain. Mathew confesses he set up the "sightings" of his dead sister to give the family reason to exhume her body and give his mother closure, but one of the hoax videos also captures Alice's bedroom being searched by Brett Toohey, a neighbor for whom Alice had worked as a babysitter. After her own search of the bedroom, Alice's mother June finds a hidden videotape showing Alice in a sexual encounter with Brett and his wife.

Ray admits that Alice met with him several months before her death and told him she was having dreams about drowning, being dead, and her mother being unable to see or help her. Alice's boyfriend comes forward with mobile phone footage of a school trip to Lake Mungo, where Alice is shown burying something at the base of a tree. The Palmers travel to Lake Mungo and find the tree, where they dig up her phone. The footage on the phone shows her walking along the lake's shore and encountering a ghostly, corpse-like doppelgänger of herself with a bloated and disfigured face, appearing just as her body would later be found in the lake.

The Palmers move out of their house, feeling that Alice wanted them to know who she really was and what she had seen. They now believe the haunting has ended and Alice's ghost has moved on. The film ends with a family photo of the Palmers on the front lawn of their house as the figure of Alice watches from the window. The credits are intercut with prior footage, revealing several sightings of Alice's ghost throughout the film that went unnoticed. After the credits, a figure that may be Alice or her doppelgänger stands at Lake Mungo, in the darkness, as lightning strikes.

Cast

Production
Writer/director Joel Anderson wrote the bulk of the film in 2005, but he was finding it difficult to acquire funding for another script he had written which required a much larger budget. After discussions with what would be future collaborators on Lake Mungo, Anderson decided to write a fictional documentary-style story that he could film on a low budget. When asked about his main inspiration for creating the script, Anderson has said, "I don't think it's a supernatural thriller. I think it's meant to be an exploration of grief." He also cited a curiosity as to how "technology is used to record people's lives and sort of tracks memories, and how technology mediates a lot of our experiences". Initial funding was attained through private investors, after which the production team approached the Australian government film funding body Screen Australia and received further funding. During casting, low profile actors were sought in an effort to maintain an authentic documentary feel. The film was shot over a period of approximately five weeks using multiple film and video formats.

There was no written dialogue in the script, only the outline of the story, so the actors were tasked with improvising their scenes. Anderson also served as the offscreen interviewer in the many documentary style interview scenes that compose the film, although his role was left uncredited.

Release
Lake Mungo premiered at the Sydney Film Festival on 18 June 2008.

In March 2009, the film screened at the South by Southwest film festival in Austin, Texas, US. On 13 March 2009, the film was shown at the Travelling Film Festival in Wagga Wagga, Australia. On 17 March, the film screened in the United Kingdom at the Barbican London Australian Film Festival. On 21 January 2010, the film was shown at the After Dark Horrorfest in the US, distributed by Lionsgate and After Dark Films.

Reception
On review aggregation Rotten Tomatoes, Lake Mungo has a 96% approval rating with an average rating of 7.70/10, based on reviews from 23 critics.

Prior to the film's wide release, Varietys Russell Edwards called it an "ambitious, restrained and well-mounted mockumentary", and praised its musical score, but critiqued the film's lighting and apparent lack of scripted dialogue.

Andrew L. Urban of Urban Cinefile wrote that "this superbly constructed and executed film gets everything right, to the smallest detail, as it draws us into the imagined scenario." Simon Miraudo of Quickflix called the film "a mournful, dreamlike examination of the hole left in the heart of a family after a death", and awarded it a score of five stars out of five.

Simon Foster of the Special Broadcasting Service declared Lake Mungo to be "one of the most impressive debut films from this country in many years" and further commented that "the young director has created a nerve-rattler unlike any film the Australian industry has produced." In her review of the film for The Hollywood Reporter, Megan Lehmann echoed these sentiments, noting the film's "compelling slow build", "surreal atmospherics", and "restrained soundtrack that works on a primal level", that "cleaves close to reality". She heralded its fusion of supernatural elements with substantive themes on family and loss, concluding that "this ambitious exploration of death and its aftershocks will reward more discerning genre fans".

Conversely, a review published by Bloody Disgusting concluded that "the ultimate problem with Lake Mungo is that the filmmakers had too many good ideas crammed into one film and not enough time to tell all their tales."

In 2020, Mike Sprague of Dread Central included the film on his list of "10 Awesome Underrated Horror Movies" to stream during the COVID-19 pandemic. Later that year, Meagan Navarro of Bloody Disgusting also recommended the film, writing that "The scares come subtle, often lurking in the background for only the most observant to notice", and calling the film a "unique horror movie, a slow-burn mystery full of twists and one seriously unnerving jump scare for the ages."

The film was nominated for Best Horror Movie at the Fright Meter Awards in 2010.

See also
 List of ghost films
 Cinema of Australia

References

External links 
 
 

2008 films
2008 horror films
2008 psychological thriller films
Australian horror films
Australian thriller films
Films set in Victoria (Australia)
Films shot in Victoria (Australia)
Found footage films
2000s English-language films